The Sunderland Art Gallery is an art gallery based within the Sunderland Museum and Winter Gardens centre, in Sunderland City Centre.

The collection of paintings includes works by the British artist, L.S. Lowry, many with local significance. For example, River Wear at Sunderland (1961) and Girl in a Red Hat on a Promenade (1972) – an enigmatic piece composed at Seaburn.

References

Art museums and galleries in Tyne and Wear
Museums in the City of Sunderland
Sunderland